Maria Vérone (1874–1938) was a French feminist and suffragist. A free-thinker, she was the president of the Ligue Française pour le Droit des Femmes (French League for Women's Rights) or LFDF, from 1919 to 1938.

Life
Vérone was born on June 20, 1874 in Paris, France. She served as secretary at the International Congress of Freethinkers when she was 15 years old. In 1903 she became the first woman to plead before French appeals court. She supported herself as a teacher, but was dismissed for her political opinions and unionizing activities.

Vérone became a reporter for the French feminist newspaper La Fronde, which was published by Marguerite Durand. Her journalism on legal and judicial matters led to her interest in becoming a lawyer. In 1907 Vérone, a single mother of two, was admitted to the French bar.

Vérone served as president of Ligue Française pour le Droit des Femmes for 20 years.

Vérone died on May 24, 1938 in Paris.

See also 
 First women lawyers around the world
 List of suffragists and suffragettes

Notes

Sources

Bibliography 
 Christine Bard. Les filles de Marianne : histoire des féminismes 1914-1940. Paris : Fayard, 1995. 
 Laurence Klejman and Florence Rochefort. « Vérone (Maria), 1874-1938 », Dictionnaire des intellectuals français, Jacques Juillard and Michel Winock, ed. Paris : Seuil, 1996.
 Raymond Hesse et Lionel Nastorg, Leur manière...: plaidoiries à la façon de... Raymond Poincaré, Maria Vérone, etc., B. Grasset, Paris, 1925, 212 p.
 Sara L. Kimble, « No Right to Judge : Feminism and the Judiciary in Third Republic France. » French Historical Studies 31, no. 4 (2008): 609–641. https://www.academia.edu/307609 https://depaul.academia.edu/SaraKimble
 Sara L. Kimble, « Popular Legal Journalism in the Writings of Maria Vérone. » PWSFH  Volume 39, 2011 http://hdl.handle.net/2027/spo.0642292.0039.021
 Juliette Rennes, Le mérite et la nature : une controverse républicaine, l'accès des femmes aux professions de prestige, 1880-1940, Fayard, 2007, 594 p.

External links 
 Maria Vérone : « Pourquoi les femmes veulent voter » (conférence du 24 avril 1914, avec une courte biographie)
 Square Maria Vérone (délibération du Conseil Municipal du 18ème arrondissement de Paris en janvier 2010)

1874 births
1938 deaths
French suffragists
French feminists
Socialist feminists
20th-century French women